William Tracy Gould (October 25, 1799 – July 18, 1882) was an American lawyer and founder of the Augusta Law School, the first law school in the Deep South.

Gould, son of Judge James Gould and Sally McCurdy Tracy, daughter of the Hon. Uriah Tracy, was born in Litchfield, Conn., October 25, 1799, and entered Yale College at the very early age of thirteen.  Immediately upon graduation he began to read law in his father's school, Litchfield Law School, and was admitted to the bar on arriving at the age of 21. In 1821 he settled in Clinton, in the central part of Georgia, and in June, 1823, he removed to the city of Augusta, where the rest of his life was spent, and where he ranked for forty years with the best lawyers of the community. He opened the Augusta Law School and maintained it with good success until it was interrupted by the affliction caused by the death of his eldest son in 1854.

He declined to enter political life, but accepted in 1851 an election to the judgeship of the City Court of Augusta, and discharged the duties of that office for fifteen years.  A severe fall several months before his death fractured a hip bone and confined him to a bed of suffering, until he died on July 18, 1882, when he had nearly completed his 83rd year.

He was married, October 7, 1824, to Anna McKinne, the widowed daughter of James Gardner, Esq., of Augusta. She died October 6, 1860, having borne him two sons (the elder a graduate of Yale in the Class of 1845) and one daughter.  He was again married, September 20, 1864, to Virginia H., daughter of Wimberly J. Hunter, Esq., of Savannah, who survived him with several children.

External links

 Litchfield Ledger

1799 births
1882 deaths
People from Litchfield, Connecticut
Yale College alumni
Litchfield Law School alumni